Rock Hills USD 107 is a public unified school district headquartered in Mankato, Kansas, United States.  The district includes the communities of Mankato, Burr Oak, Esbon, Formoso, Jewell, Webber, Ionia, Lovewell, Montrose, North Branch, Otego, and nearby rural areas.

Schools
The school district operates the following schools:
 Rock Hills High School
 Jewell Junior High School
 Rock Hills Middle School
 Rock Hills Elementary School

History
It was formed in 2006 by the consolidation of White Rock USD 104 and Mankato USD 278. In 2009 it had absorbed some territory from USD 279 Jewell due to that district's dissolution.

See also
 Kansas State Department of Education
 Kansas State High School Activities Association
 List of high schools in Kansas
 List of unified school districts in Kansas

References

External links
 

School districts in Kansas
School districts established in 2006
2006 establishments in Kansas
Jewell County, Kansas